The 1925 World Allround Speed Skating Championships took place on the 21st and 22 February 1925 at the ice rink Bislett Stadion in Oslo, Norway.

Roald Larsen was defending champion but did not succeed in prolonging his title.
Clas Thunberg became World champion for the second time.

Allround results 

  * = Fell
 NC = Not classified
 NF = Not finished
 NS = Not started
 DQ = Disqualified
Source: SpeedSkatingStats.com

Rules 
Four distances have to be skated:
 500m
 1500m
 5000m
 10000m

The ranking was made by award ranking points. The points were awarded to the skaters who had skated all the distances. The final ranking was then decided by ordering the skaters by lowest point totals.
 1 point for 1st place
 2 point for 2nd place
 3 point for 3rd place
 and so on

One could win the World Championships also by winning at least three of the four distances, so the ranking could be affected by this.

Silver and bronze medals were awarded.

References 

World Allround Speed Skating Championships, 1925
1925 World Allround
World Allround, 1925
International sports competitions in Oslo
1925 in Norwegian sport
February 1925 sports events
1920s in Oslo